Balsamorhiza careyana is a species of flowering plant in the tribe Heliantheae of the family Asteraceae known by the common name Carey's balsamroot. It is native to northwestern United States Washington and Oregon where it grows in arid and desert regions east of the Cascades. It is very similar to a close relative Balsamorhiza sagittata, but its leaves are more sandpaper-like instead of soft and hairy, and it is probably more resistant to drought.

References

External links

careyana
Flora of Oregon
Flora of Washington (state)
Endemic flora of the United States
Flora without expected TNC conservation status